The Happy Husband is a comedy play by the British-based Australian author Harrison Owen. It premiered at the Theatre Royal, Portsmouth before transferring to the Criterion Theatre in London's West End where it ran for 109 performances between 15 June and 17 September 1927. The London cast included Madge Titheradge, Stella Arbenina, A.E. Matthews, Charles Laughton, Lawrence Grossmith, David Hawthorne, Carl Harbord in his West End debut, Marda Vanne and Ann Trevor. It was produced by Basil Dean. It was staged at the Empire Theatre on Broadway the following year, running for 72 performances.

Adaptation
In 1931 it was adapted into a British film Uneasy Virtue directed by Norman Walker and featuring Fay Compton, Edmund Breon, Francis Lister and Margot Grahame.

References

Bibliography
 Goble, Alan. The Complete Index to Literary Sources in Film. Walter de Gruyter, 1999.
 Wearing, J.P. The London Stage 1920-1929: A Calendar of Productions, Performers, and Personnel. Rowman & Littlefield, 2014.

1927 plays
West End plays
British plays
Comedy plays
British plays adapted into films